Anthony S. "Tony" Black (born September 4, 1951) is a record-holding jockey in North American Thoroughbred horse racing. He is a nephew of U.S. Racing Hall of Fame jockey and New Jersey state steward, Sam Boulmetis Sr.

He was raised in Haddon Township, New Jersey, where he has been a longtime resident, and attended Haddon Township High School, graduating in the class of 1970.

Black won his first race at Liberty Bell Park Racetrack in Philadelphia, Pennsylvania, on June 15, 1970. At Philadelphia Park (now Parx Casino and Racing) on May 1, 2006, the 54-year-old Black became only the 21st jockey in North American racing history to win 5,000 races.

Black is also a co-holder of the North American record for most consecutive wins by a jockey, tying Albert Adams' 63-year old record set on July 30, 1993. Black won three back to back to back rides races at the Atlantic City Race Course, followed by two straight at Philadelphia Park on July 31 and another four in a row that same day back at Atlantic City.

Black won his 5,200th career race in the ninth race at Parx on March 18, 2013, aboard Smart Tori, a horse owned by his son. Black had previously indicated that he would retire as a jockey after reaching that milestone.

Year-end charts

References
 May 3, 2006 ESPN article titled Anthony Black rides 5000th winner
  NTRA Thoroughbred Notebook on Tony Black's record nine consecutive race wins set in 1993

1951 births
Living people
American jockeys
People from Haddon Township, New Jersey
People from Mount Holly, New Jersey
Sportspeople from the Delaware Valley